Henryk Melcer-Szczawiński (25 July 1869 – 18 April 1928) was a Polish composer, pianist, conductor, and teacher.

Works

Orchestral works
 Piano Concerto in e minor (1892-4)
 Piano Concerto in c minor (1898)
 Symphony in c minor

Stage Works
 "Protesilas i Laodamia" (1902, libretto by S. Wyspiański) (Tragedy)

Chamber music

 Violin Sonata in G Major (1907),
 Piano Trio in g minor (probably written 1892-4)
 Dumka for Violin and Piano
 Canon for Violin, Cello and Piano (1890)

Piano works

 Trois Morceaux Caracteristiques Op. 5, for solo piano
 Morceau fantastique (Phantasiestück)
 Etude in D major, Op. 8
 Nocturne in A major
 Prelude in C major
 Fugue in C-sharp minor
 Variations sur un theme populaire polonais
 Quasi mazurka sur le theme W.M.S.
 Valse a la Chopin
 La Fileuse de l'opera "Maria"
 Canons (1890)

Recordings
Both piano concertos were recorded in the past on Olympia and on Muza, and in 2007 on Hyperion. The Violin Sonata in G major, the Dumka for Violin and Piano and the Piano Trio, Op. 2 were recorded by the Warsaw Trio and Piano Works were recorded by Matti Asikainen for the AP label.

References

Sources

External links

 Scores by Henryk Melcer-Szczawiński in digital library Polona

Polish composers
Polish conductors (music)
Male conductors (music)
Polish classical pianists
Male classical pianists
1869 births
1928 deaths
Academic staff of the Chopin University of Music
Academic staff of Lviv Conservatory
19th-century classical pianists
19th-century male musicians
Musicians from Warsaw